The krem is a musical instrument, a type of bamboo tube zither played by the Jah Hut group of the Orang Asli tribal peoples of Malaysia.

The instrument is made of a bamboo tube, open at one end and with some slits for sound-holes; it has two strings, previously made of roots but now often nylon. The root strings were once coated with resin to produce a "loud, firm sound." The instrument may be plucked or bowed, and is mainly played by women.

See also
 Pergam, another bamboo zither, but idiochord, played by the Jah Hut people

References

Bamboo musical instruments
Orang Asli musical instruments
Malaysian musical instruments
Bowed instruments
Tube zithers